Grady's Cold Brew is an American coffee company known for its New Orleans-style cold brew coffee. Founded in 2011, the company is based in The Bronx, New York.

History
 
Grady's Cold Brew was originally started by Grady Laird. He created a New Orleans-style blend while working for GQ Magazine. He was inspired by an article in GQ that taught how to make cold brew coffee concentrate. Laird sold his brew to other magazines in the Condé Nast brand but later quit his job to pursue it full-time. He officially launched the brand in 2011 with the help of Dave Sands and Kyle Buckley.
 
Grady's was originally sold online and at select retailers in Brooklyn and Manhattan. It gained the attention of Whole Foods while a vendor at Smorgasburg, and began selling at the grocery chain in 2012.

Products
 
Grady's Cold Brew is a New Orleans-style coffee made using a cold brew method of steeping ground coffee in cold water. The grounds are filtered out after 20 hours to create the concentrate. The company sells both ready-to-drink and concentrate as well as pre-packaged bean bags.

References

External links
 Grady's Cold Brew website

American companies established in 2011
Coffee companies of the United States
2011 establishments in New York (state)
Food and drink companies established in 2011
Food and drink companies based in New York (state)
Companies based in the Bronx